The year 2019 is the 16th year in the history of the Wu Lin Feng, a Chinese kickboxing promotion.

List of events

Wu Lin Feng 2019: WLF -65kg World Championship Tournament

Wu Lin Feng 2019: WLF -65kg World Tournament was a kickboxing event held on January 02, 2019 in Zhuhai, China.

Results

Wu Lin Feng 2019: WLF World Cup 2018-2019 Final

Wu Lin Feng 2019: WLF World Cup 2018-2019 Final was a kickboxing event held on January 19, 2019 in Haikou, China.

Results

Wu Lin Feng 2019: WLF Championship in Zhengzhou

Wu Lin Feng 2019: WLF Championship in Zhengzhou was a kickboxing event held on February 23, 2019 in Zhengzhou, China.

Results

Wu Lin Feng 2019: WLF x Gods of War XII - China vs Greece

Wu Lin Feng 2019: WLF x Gods of War XII - China vs Greece was a kickboxing event held on March 24, 2019 in Athens, Greece.

Results

Wu Lin Feng 2019: WLF x Lumpinee - China vs Thailand

Wu Lin Feng 2019: WLF x Lumpinee - China vs Thailand was a kickboxing event held on March 30, 2019 in Zhengzhou, China.

Results

Wu Lin Feng 2019: WLF China vs Estonia

Wu Lin Feng 2019: WLF China vs Estonia was a kickboxing event held on April 13, 2019 in Tallinn, Estonia.

Results

Wu Lin Feng 2019: WLF -63kg Championship World Tournament

Wu Lin Feng 2019: WLF -63kg Championship World Tournament was a kickboxing event held on April 27, 2019 in Zhuhai, China.

Results

Wu Lin Feng 2019: WLF China vs Canada & 70kg World Championship Tournament

Wu Lin Feng 2019: WLF China vs Canada & 70kg World Championship Tournament was a kickboxing event held on May 25, 2019 in Zhengzhou, China.

Results

Wu Lin Feng 2019: WLF -67kg World Cup 2019-2020 1st Group Stage

Wu Lin Feng 2019: WLF -67kg World Cup 2019-2020 1st Group Stage was a kickboxing event held on June 29, 2019 in Zhengzhou, China.

Results

Wu Lin Feng 2019: WLF x Krush 103 - China vs Japan

Wu Lin Feng 2019: WLF x Krush 103 - China vs Japan was a kickboxing event held on July 21, 2019 in Tokyo, Japan.

Results

Wu Lin Feng 2019: WLF -67kg World Cup 2019-2020 2nd Group Stage

Wu Lin Feng 2019: WLF -67kg World Cup 2019-2020 2nd Group Stage was a kickboxing event held on July 27, 2019 in Zhengzhou, China.

Results

Wu Lin Feng 2019: WLF -67kg World Cup 2019-2020 3rd Group Stage

Wu Lin Feng 2019: WLF -67kg World Cup 2019-2020 3rd Group Stage was a kickboxing event held on August 31, 2019 in Zhengzhou, China.

Results

Wu Lin Feng 2019: WLF at Lumpinee - China vs Thailand

Wu Lin Feng 2019: WLF at Lumpinee - China vs Thailand was a kickboxing event held on September 06, 2019 in Bangkok, Thailand.

Results

Wu Lin Feng 2019: WLF China vs Russia

Wu Lin Feng 2019: WLF China vs Russia was a kickboxing event held on September 20, 2019 in Moscow, Russia.

Results

Wu Lin Feng 2019: WLF -67kg World Cup 2019-2020 4th Group Stage

Wu Lin Feng 2019: WLF -67kg World Cup 2019-2020 4th Group Stage was a kickboxing event held on September 28, 2019 in Zhengzhou, China.

Results

Wu Lin Feng 2019: WLF in Manila

Wu Lin Feng 2019: WLF in Manila was a kickboxing event held on October 23, 2019 in Manila, Philippines.

Results

Wu Lin Feng 2019: WLF -67kg World Cup 2019-2020 5th Group Stage

Wu Lin Feng 2019: WLF -67kg World Cup 2019-2020 5th Group Stage was a kickboxing event held on October 26, 2019 in Zhengzhou, China.

Results

Wu Lin Feng 2019: WLF -67kg World Cup 2019-2020 6th Group Stage

Wu Lin Feng 2019: WLF -67kg World Cup 2019-2020 6th Group Stage was a kickboxing event held on November 30, 2019 in Zhengzhou, China.

Results

Wu Lin Feng 2019: East vs West Series - China vs Canada

Wu Lin Feng 2019: East vs West Series - China vs Canada was a kickboxing event held on December 14, 2019 in Markham, Ontario, Canada.

Results

See also
 2019 in Glory 
 2019 in K-1
 2019 in Kunlun Fight
 2019 in ONE Championship
 2019 in Romanian kickboxing

References

2019 in kickboxing
Kickboxing in China